Korea comprises the Korean Peninsula (the mainland) and 3,960 nearby islands. The peninsula is located in Northeast Asia, between China and Japan. To the northwest, the Amnok River (Yalu River) separates Korea from China and to the northeast, the Duman River (Tumen River) separates Korea from China and Russia. The Yellow Sea lies to the west, the East China Sea and Korea Strait to the south, and the Korean East Sea to the east. Notable islands include Jeju Island (Jejudo), Ulleung Island (Ulleungdo), and the Liancourt Rocks.

At 223,179 km2, the area of Korea is similar to the area of the United Kingdom (244,100 km2) or the U.S. state of Minnesota (225,171 km2). Excluding the islands, the area of the Korean Peninsula is 220,847 km2. The peninsula measures approx. 1,100 km from north to south and 300 km from east to west.

The southern and western parts of the peninsula have well-developed plains, while the eastern and northern parts are mountainous. The highest mountain in Korea, Mount Paektu or Paektusan, stands on the border with China. The southern extension of Mount Paektu, a highland called Gaema Heights, was mainly raised during the Cenozoic orogeny and partly covered by volcanic matter. To the south of Gaema Gowon (the Gaema Plateau), successive high mountains are located along the eastern coast of the peninsula.  This mountain range is named Baekdudaegan. Some significant mountains include Mount Sobaek or Sobaeksan, Mount Kumgang or Kumgangsan, Mount Seorak or Seoraksan, Mount Taebaek or Taebaeksan, and Mount Jiri or Jirisan. There are several lower, secondary mountain ranges whose direction is almost perpendicular to that of Baekdudaegan. They developed along the tectonic line of Mesozoic orogeny and their directions are basically northwest.

Unlike most ancient mountains on the mainland, many important islands in Korea were formed by volcanic activity in the Cenozoic orogeny. Jeju Island, situated off the southern coast, is a large volcanic island whose main mountain, Mount Halla or Hallasan, is the highest in South Korea. Ulleung Island is a volcanic island in the Sea of Japan whose composition is more felsic than Jeju-do. The volcanic islands tend to be younger, the more westward.

Because the mountainous region is mostly on the eastern part of the peninsula, the main  rivers tend to flow westwards. Two exceptions are the southward-flowing Nakdong River (Nakdonggang) and Seomjin River (Seomjingang). Important rivers running westward include the Amnok River, the  Chongchon River (Chongchongang), the Taedong River (Taedonggang), the Han River (Hangang), the Geum River (Geumgang), and the Yeongsan River (Yeongsangang). These rivers have vast flood plains and provide an ideal environment for wet-rice cultivation.

The southern and southwestern coastlines of Korea form a well-developed ria coastline, known as Dadohae-jin in  Korean. This convoluted coastline results in mild seas, and this calm environment allows for safe navigation, fishing, and seaweed farming. In addition to the complex coastline, the western coast of the Korean Peninsula has an extremely high tidal amplitude (at Incheon, around the middle of the western coast, it can get as high as ). Vast tidal flats have been developing on the south and west coastlines.

Physical geography

Mountains cover 70 percent of Korea and arable plains are generally small and fall between the successive mountain ranges. The peninsula becomes more mountainous towards the north and the east, with the highest mountains (including Baekdu Mountain which stands at ) found in the north.

The peninsula has  of coastline, and the south and west coasts are particularly irregular. Most of the 3,579 islands off the peninsula are found along the south and the west coasts.

Climate

The climate of Korea differs dramatically from north to south. The southern regions experience a relatively warm and wet climate similar to that of Japan, affected by warm ocean waters including the East Korea Warm Current. The northern regions experience a colder and to some extent more inland climate, in common with Manchuria. For example, the annual precipitation of the Yalu River valley is less than half of that on the south coast.  Likewise, there is a  difference in January temperature between the peninsula's southern and northern tips.

The entire peninsula, however, is affected by similar climatic patterns, including the East Asian Monsoon in midsummer and frequent typhoons in autumn. The majority of rainfall takes place during the summer months, with nearly half during the monsoon alone. Winters are cold, with January temperatures typically below freezing outside of Jeju Island. Winter precipitation is minimal, with little snow accumulation outside of mountainous areas.

Biology
Surveys of Korean flora have identified more than 3,000 species on the peninsula, of which more than 500 are endemic. The peninsula's floristic provinces are commonly divided between warm-temperate, temperate, and cold-temperate zones. The warm-temperate zone prevails over the southern coast and islands, including Jeju-do. It is largely typified by broad-leaved evergreens.

The temperate zone covers the great majority of the peninsula, away from the southern coast and high mountains. It is dominated by the Korean pine and various broad-leaved deciduous trees. Cold-temperate vegetation is found along the peninsula's northern fringe and in the high mountains, including the upper reaches of Hallasan on Jeju. Evergreens in this area include larch and juniper. Much of this vegetation is shared with Manchuria.

According to the World Wide Fund for Nature, Korea consists of several ecoregions. The Southern Korea evergreen forests occupy the southernmost portion of the peninsula, as well as the island of Jeju. The Central Korean deciduous forests occupy the more temperate central portion of the peninsula. Manchurian mixed forests occupy the northern lowlands and low hills of the peninsula, and extend north into Manchuria as far as the Amur River on the Russia-China border. The Changbai Mountains mixed forests include the higher elevation mountain region along the North Korea-China border, where forests are dominated by conifers, with alpine meadows and rock slopes on the highest peaks.

Geology

The terrain of Korea is rumpled, covered with low mountains. Most rocks are of Precambrian origin, although isolated pockets of Paleozoic, Mesozoic, and Cenozoic rock can also be found.

There are no active volcanoes on the peninsula. However, Baekdu Mountain in the north and Hallasan in the south have crater lakes, indicating that they were active not long ago. Furthermore, hot springs indicative of low-level volcanic activity are widespread throughout the peninsula.  Roughly two earthquakes are recorded per year, but few have any major impact.

See also

 Geography of North Korea
 Geography of South Korea
 Geology of North Korea
 Geology of South Korea
 Jeju Island
 Korea
 North Korea
 South Korea

References

External links
 Maps of Korea at the American Geographical Society Library Digital Map Collection
 "Atlas of Korea with a World Map" from the Ming dynasty

 
Korea
Korea